The 1974 Swedish Open was a men's tennis tournament played on outdoor clay courts held in Båstad, Sweden. It was classified as a Group B category tournament and was part of the 1974 Grand Prix circuit. It was the 27th edition of the tournament and was held from 8 July until 14 July 1974. Björn Borg won the singles title.

Finals

Singles

 Björn Borg defeated  Adriano Panatta 6–3, 6–0, 6–7, 6–3
 It was Borg's 6th singles title of the year and of his career.

Doubles
 Paolo Bertolucci /  Adriano Panatta defeated  Ove Nils Bengtson /  Björn Borg 3–6, 6–2, 6–4

References

External links
 ITF tournament edition details

Swedish Open
Swedish Open
Swedish Open
July 1974 sports events in Europe